Sandra Wendy Dawson (born 30 October 1962) is a former Irish international cricketer who played for the Irish national team between 1993 and 2000. She played in 24 One Day International (ODI) matches, including games at the 1993, 1997 and 2000 World Cups.

Dawson was born in Dublin. She made her ODI debut for Ireland at the 1993 World Cup in England, against New Zealand. A wicket-keeper who generally batted in the lower order, Dawson was Ireland's primary wicket-keeper throughout the remainder of the 1990s. She had little success as a batsman, with her highest ODI score being only 13 not out. That innings came in what was to be her final ODI, played against South Africa at the 2000 World Cup in New Zealand, and included an unbroken ten-wicket partnership of 37 runs with Barbara McDonald, which set a new Irish record. Dawson's ODI career batting average was just 7.42. While not playing internationally, she played several seasons of English county cricket, representing Middlesex and Surrey.

References

External links
 Sandra Dawson at CricketArchive
 Sandra Dawson at ESPNcricinfo

1962 births
Living people
Ireland women One Day International cricketers
Irish expatriate sportspeople in England
Irish women cricketers
Cricketers from County Dublin
Middlesex women cricketers
Surrey women cricketers
Wicket-keepers